I. Fliegerkorps (1st Air Corps) was formed 11 October 1939 in Cologne from the 1st Air Division. The Corps was also known as Luftwaffenkommando Don between 26 August 1942 until 17 February 1943. It was transformed to the 18th Air Division on 4 April 1945.

Commanding officers
Generaloberst Ulrich Grauert, 11 October 1939 – 15 May 1941
General der Flieger Helmuth Förster, 3 June 1941 – 23 August 1942
General der Flieger Günther Korten, 24 August 1942 – 11 June 1943
Generalleutnant Alfred Mahnke (acting), 1 April 1943 – 25 June 1943
Generalleutnant Karl Angerstein, 26 June 1943 – 6 November 1943
General der Flieger Paul Deichmann, 7 November 1943 – 3 April 1945

Chiefs of Staff
 Oberst Rudolf Meister, 18 December 1939 – 22 June 1940
 Generalmajor Walter Boenicke, 22 June 1940 – 8 November 1941
 Oberst Werner Kreipe, 8 November 1941 – 25 October 1942
 Oberst Klaus Uebe, 25 October 1942 – 24 August 1943

References
 I. Fliegerkorps @ Lexikon der Wehrmacht
 I. Fliegerkorps @ The Luftwaffe, 1933-45

A001
Military units and formations established in 1939
1939 establishments in Germany
Military units and formations disestablished in 1945